Cotaena mediana is a species of sedge moth, and for a long time the only species in the genus Cotaena. It was described by Francis Walker in 1864. It is widespread throughout the Amazon, including Brazil.

It is a colourful species.

References

External links
 Cotaena mediana at Zipcodezoo.com

Moths described in 1864
Glyphipterigidae